Gravel Springs is an unincorporated community in Frederick County, Virginia, United States. Gravel Springs was established in 1872. It lies south of Star Tannery at the intersection of Brill, Star Tannery, and Gravel Springs Roads.

References

Unincorporated communities in Frederick County, Virginia
Unincorporated communities in Virginia
Populated places established in 1872
1872 establishments in Virginia